St. Mary's High School is a Catholic secondary school in Kitchener, Ontario, Canada. It serves most of Kitchener's Catholic students, with others attending Resurrection Catholic Secondary School. Members of its sports teams are known as the Eagles.

History

The school was originally located in downtown Kitchener, where it was founded as the Girls' School to complement the adjacent boys-only St. Jerome's High School. As the latter school had older infrastructure, it was closed and St. Mary's was made co-ed in 1990. In 2002, the school moved from the downtown to the southern suburbs, where there would be far less commuting time for most students.

The former school buildings have been given differing fates: one auxiliary building was demolished; the main St. Jerome's facility has been renovated to house Wilfrid Laurier University's Faculty of Social Work, and the main St. Mary's building now houses both the Catholic School Board offices and the Kitchener Downtown Community Centre.

In the autumn of 2004, a new branch of the Kitchener Public Library opened within the new school building.

The school's fall 2005 enrollment was 2,200 students. This population was still far higher than the anticipated capacity; 25 portable classrooms are currently installed on the grounds, and no student parking is available due to the need for faculty parking, however, the newly constructed arena, the Activa Center, allows students use of its parking lot during school hours.

As of October 2008, the school's population was 2,123, making it one of the largest in Ontario.

The new school building features a Triple Gym, an auditorium/theatre known as Alumni Hall, as well as a large cafeteria.  The school also houses tennis courts and 2 soccer/football fields.

In 2019, the school applied for an Aviva Community Fund  that would allow for a facelift for their tennis courts and transform these courts into multi-purpose courts.

The school was granted $345,000 for facility improvements funded primarily by the Hallman Foundation which included developing their multi-purpose court, green gym, and park benches thanks to the work of The Legacy Committee.

Several notable events have occurred at the new school since its opening in 2002. These events include: a bomb scare in 2004, again in September 2010 and again in April 2016, a fire in the central stairwell in 2005, and a chemical scare in 2006. Also, in 2008, an E. coli scare emerged in the school's cafetorium, affecting several students.

In June 2011, the school received its first silver Certification in the WCDSB from Ontario Eco-School. with addition in June 2013 they arrive another silver Certification with Eco-School.

The school's motto Virtus et Scientia, meaning Virtue and Knowledge, has continued to be written in the lives of their graduates. As an extension to the school's classic motto, Virtus et Scientia, they have implemented their mission statement "Where Kindness Matters, Community Grows!".

The school promotes this motto at the end of all of its announcements and makes sure to spread positivity around their school community. As a celebration of kindness, each year the school holds an annual Kindness Matters barbecue to sum up a fantastic year. This allows for all students to share a common lunch and join in participating in different games and activities while enjoying a free barbecue lunch and other great snacks.

In 2019, the Ion light rail system (LRT) brought passenger rail service to its newly constructed Block Line station, located one block from SMHS. This has allowed for easier and more convenient transportation for students.

Athletics

In late spring 2007, the girl's slo-pitch team became WCSSA champions. They ended their season with 22 wins and 0 losses – a perfect season. They also competed in two tournaments in addition to the regular season, one in Toronto hosted by Bishop Allen and one in Kitchener at the Peter Hallman ballpark. They won both tournaments. Since then, they have gone 81-1-0 as of 2010.

In 2008/2009, the Activa Arena Complex, built by the city of Kitchener, was constructed beside the campus. The arena is now home to St. Mary's hockey teams, and it also houses the Lennox Lewis Boxing School.

In the spring of 2020 the COVID-19 pandemic, resulted in the closure of schools, which resulted in the cancellation of all athletics in the Waterloo Catholic District School Board. On September 16, 2021, the Waterloo Catholic District School Board and District 8 Athletic Association, have announced that all students (born 2009 and earlier), and teacher-coaches who want to participate in interschool athletics must be fully vaccinated against COVID-19 (two doses plus 14-day waiting period) or provide negative rapid antigen test results to their school twice per week. All officials and volunteer coaches (non-school staff) must be fully vaccinated against COVID-19 (two doses plus 14-day waiting period) to participate in interschool athletics. This announcement is effective on September 20, 2021

Fall Sports For The 2021-2022 School Season:
 Basketball (Junior Girls, Senior Girls)
 Cross Country
 Field Hockey (Girls)
 Football (Junior Boys, Senior Boys)
Golf (Junior Boys, Senior Boys, Girls)
 Soccer (Junior Boys)
 Tennis (Junior, Senior)
 Volleyball (Junior Boys, Senior Boys)

Winter Sports For The 2021-2022 School Season:
 Basketball (Midget Boys, Junior Boys, Senior Boys)
 Curling (Novice, Intermediate, Senior)
 Hockey (Junior Boys, Senior Boys, Girls)
Powerlifting 
 Swimming
 Volleyball (Midget Girls, Junior Girls, Senior Girls)
 Wrestling

Spring Sports For The 2021-2022 School Season:
 Badminton (Junior, Senior)
 Mud Puppy Chase (Special Education Students only)
 Rugby (Junior Boys, Senior Boys, Girls)
 Soccer (Senior Boys, Girls)
 Softball (Girls, Boys)
 Special Olympics (Special Education Students only)
 Track and Field
Triathlon
Ultimate Frisbee

St. Mary's is a member of the eight team District 8 Athletic Association

Performance arts
The campus' theatre, Alumni Hall, has been host to several theatrical productions.  It is one of the only high schools in the Waterloo Region that produces two productions every year - one in the fall and one in the spring. The school's most successful production since its relocation was The Pirates of Penzance, the only show in SMH history to sell out all four nights (May 2–5, 2007)
Other productions to date include Tommy, the Who's infamous rock opera(Date to Date, 2011), The Three Musketeers by Peter Raby (Date to Date, 2012), The Crucible by Arthur Miller (May 8–10, 2013), WASP (2018), and Man Eating Sandwich (2020 and interrupted by the pandemic). Currently they are working on Spongebob the Musical (2023 April). At times St. Mary's has been the largest Drama program in the KW area (even having a larger enrollment than Arts focused Eastwood).

Clubs

Being such a large, diverse school, there are many non-athletic opportunities for students to get involved in the school community. They include: Art Club, Bible Study Group, Board Games Club, Concert Band, Dance Team, DECA, Eagle Buddies, Environmental Club, Hypercussion, Investment Club, Key Club (Local Area), Link Crew, March For Life (Trip to Ottawa, ON), Mission Collection, Newspaper, Nutrition for Learning, Outdoor Adventure Club, Relay For Life, Science Olympics, Skills Canada, Social Action Team, Tech Crew, The Nest and Yearbook (Separate with non-club), as well as many others.

A relatively new club that presents support and encouragement for diversity amongst the students and staff is St. Mary's PRISM club (Pride and Respect for Individuals of a Sexual Minority). This club is a supportive group of individuals who build a safe space and stand in solidarity to combat hate and harassment directed towards those who identify as a sexual minority. The PRISM club helps to reinforce the sense of community and belonging that St. Mary's values. The goal of PRISM is to offer support for LBGTQ+ youth and advocate for their rights and inclusion for all.

As a way of showing support each year on a specific date students are allowed to wear purple shirts to help build awareness for the LGBTQ+ community. Their purple shirts signal the need to stand up against homophobia and hate crimes and give visible witness to our faith which teaches us about inclusion, kindness, and peace.

As well there has been a massive increase in the support and awareness for the Black Lives Matter movement. Students at SMHS collectively started a Black Lives Matter club where they continue to bring awareness to the situation and support to those discriminated against due to race, ethnicity, or colour.

In celebration, St. Mary's holds a Black History Month full of events to recognize and showcase the talents, achievements, and culture of St. Mary's own students as they demonstrate pride in their own heritage and culture. Students are able to learn able the contributions of minorities in Canada and how as a society, they can work towards a more inclusive world of all races and cultures.

School activities and improvements are conceived and organized by the Student Activities Council, commonly known as SAC. SAC is typically headed by two co-presidents. The council consists of positions like the Arts Reps, Assembly Reps, Athletic Reps, Social Justice Reps, Special Events Reps, Spirit Reps, Healthy Schools Reps, Special Education Reps, Inclusivity Reps, Multicultural Reps, Tech Reps, Communications Reps, Grade Nine Reps and the Faith Rep. SAC keeps students informed with current events, fundraisers, and initiatives.

In 2018 St. Mary's hosted their first annual Relay for Life. In support of those battling cancer, those who have survived cancer, and loved ones lost to cancer, St. Mary's staff, students, and community members come together each year to raise money to help support vital cancer research and patient support programs. On the day of the event, students spend the whole day together on their football field participating in activities, games, and performances and enjoying free food. While on the field students must participate in a group effort to walk around the football field in support of cancer patients who do not have this ability.

Specialist High Skills Major 
St. Mary's High School participates and encourages their grade 11 and 12 students to join their Specialist High Skills Major program (SHSM). This program allows for students to partake in numerous workshops that will earn valuable industry certifications and encourages focus on a career path matching their skills and interests.

St. Mary's specifically supports grade 11's and 12's who participate in this program by incorporating this into their co-operative education classes as a requirement and providing a Red Seal on their diploma if successfully completed.  Students participating in SHSM are required to take courses specifically related to their Major such as - Arts, Business, Health and Wellness, Justice, Community Safety & Emergency Services, etc.

The school's co-operative education (Co-op) classes allow students to gain experience in many different trades and fields of work. St. Mary's Co-op class gives students the chance to see what it is like to work in a profession they are interested in and allows for students to develop helpful skills and earn hands-on experience.

Notable alumni
 Boyd Devereaux, NHL hockey player (Edmonton Oilers, Detroit Red Wings, Phoenix Coyotes, Toronto Maple Leafs)
 David Eby, leader of the British Columbia NDP since October 21, 2022, and the premier-designate of British Columbia.
 David Edgar, soccer player

 Lisa LaFlamme, former chief news correspondent for CTV
 Don Maloney, NHL hockey player (New York Rangers, Hartford Whalers, New York Islanders), GM of Phoenix Coyotes
 Paul Reinhart, NHL hockey player (Calgary Flames)

See also
 List of high schools in Ontario

References 

 Approximation for the 2009/2010 school year

External links 
 History of St. Mary's High School
 

Waterloo Catholic District School Board
Catholic secondary schools in Ontario
Schools in Kitchener, Ontario
High schools in the Regional Municipality of Waterloo
Educational institutions established in 1907
1907 establishments in Ontario